Frank A. Wenstrom (July 27, 1903 – May 12, 1997) was a North Dakota Republican Party politician who served as the 28th Lieutenant Governor of North Dakota under Governor William L. Guy. Wenstrom also served in the North Dakota Senate for District 1 from 1957 to 1960 and 1967 to 1986, and was the President of the state's second Constitutional Convention.

Franklin Augustus Wenstrom was born and grew up in Wells County, North Dakota. He was the son of James A. Wenstrom (1874-1963) and Anna (Kringstad) Wenstrom (1874-1967). His parents were of Norwegian and Swedish immigrant heritage. Beginning in 1933, he worked in the oil business in Carrington, North Dakota. In 1945, he became secretary- manager for the Williston (N.D.) Chamber of Commerce. Wenstrom worked as public relations officer for First National Bank of Williston (1951-1960).

In 1938, he was married to Mary Esther Pickett (1907-2002).  Wenstrom died at age 93 in 1997 and was buried at Riverview Cemetery in Williston.

References

External links
Frank A. & M. Esther Wenstrom Foundation

Lieutenant Governors of North Dakota
1903 births
1997 deaths
Republican Party North Dakota state senators
American public relations people
20th-century American politicians
American people of Norwegian descent
American people of Swedish descent
1992 United States presidential electors